S. Sunil is an Indian filmmaker, theatre director, screenwriter and an academic, who works in Malayalam cinema and theatre. He is known for such films as Kaliyorukkam, Marubhagham and Vishudha Rathrikal as well as theatre productions like Kandamrugam, a drama based on Eugène Ionesco's Rhinoceros. He is a recipient of the 2008 Kerala State Film Award for Best Children's Film.

Career 
Sunil debuted as a filmmaker with a children's film, Kaliyorukkam (Groundwork) in 2007 and the film received the Kerala State Film Award for Best Children's Film. This was followed by Marubhagham (The Other Side), based on a poem by Nicanor Parra, in 2015 and it won the Special Mention Award at the 10th SiGNS film festival. The film was also screened as a part of a specially curated film package at the 2016 Kochi-Muziris Biennale. The third film was Vishudha Rathrikal (Moral Nights) in 2021, an anthology film comprising five stories, featuring Santhosh Keezhattoor, Alencier Ley Lopez and Anil Nedumangad among others.

Sunil serves as an assistant professor at School of Drama and Fine Arts, Thrissur and holds the position of the Dean of the Faculty of Fine Arts at the of University of Calicut. He is also a member of the directorate of the International Theatre Festival of Kerala, organized by the Kerala Sangeetha Nataka Akademi.

Filmography

See also 

 Sudhi Anna

References

Further reading

External links 
 
 
 
 
 

People from Kannur district
Malayalam film directors
Film directors from Kerala
21st-century Indian film directors
Year of birth missing (living people)
Malayalam screenwriters
Malayali people
Academic staff of the University of Calicut
Living people